The Shaheen-Goodfellow Weekend Cottage, also known as Stoneflower, is a historic house at 704 Stony Ridge Road in Eden Isle, Arkansas, a resort community on a peninsula jutting into Greers Ferry Lake west of Heber Springs.  It is a distinctive Modern structure, designed by Arkansas architect E. Fay Jones and completed in 1965. The main structure is a relatively small rectangular wood-frame structure, given vertical emphasis by its placement at the top of a slope and vertical board-and-batten siding.  On the lake side (the downslope side) of the house a wooden deck projects from the upper level, with vertical railing elements and an outdoor cooking area built in.  The house is a clear predecessor to one of Jones' signature works, Thorncrown Chapel, with which it shares design and construction methods, albeit in a smaller scale.

The house was listed on the National Register of Historic Places in 2002.

See also
National Register of Historic Places listings in Cleburne County, Arkansas

References

Houses on the National Register of Historic Places in Arkansas
Houses completed in 1965
Houses in Cleburne County, Arkansas